The unknown years of Jesus (also called his silent years, lost years, or missing years) generally refers to the period of Jesus's life between his childhood and the beginning of his ministry, a period not described in the New Testament.

The "lost years of Jesus" concept is usually encountered in esoteric literature (where it at times also refers to his possible post-crucifixion activities) but is not commonly used in scholarly literature since it is assumed that Jesus was probably working as a carpenter in Galilee, at least some of the time with Joseph, from the age of 12 to 29.

In the 19th and 20th centuries theories began to emerge that between the ages of 12 and 29 Jesus had visited India, or had studied with the Essenes in the Judea desert. Modern mainstream Christian scholarship has generally rejected these theories and holds that nothing is known about this time period in the life of Jesus.

The use of the "lost years" in the "swoon hypothesis", suggests that Jesus survived his crucifixion and continued his life, instead of what was stated in the New Testament that he ascended into Heaven with two angels. This, and the related view that he avoided crucifixion altogether, has given rise to several speculations about what happened to him in the supposed remaining years of his life, but these are not accepted by mainstream scholars either.

The 18 unknown years

New Testament gap

Following the accounts of Jesus' young life, there is a gap of about 18 years in his story in the New Testament. Other than the  statement that after he was 12 years old (Luke 2:42) Jesus "advanced in wisdom and stature, and in favour with God and men" (Luke 2:52), the New Testament has no other details regarding the gap. Christian tradition suggests that Jesus simply lived in Galilee during that period. Modern scholarship holds that there is little historical information to determine what happened during those years.

The ages of 12 and 29, the approximate ages at either end of the unknown years, have some significance in Judaism of the Second Temple period: 13 is the age of the bar mitzvah, the age of secular maturity, and 30 the age of readiness for the priesthood, although Jesus was not of the tribe of Levi.

Christians have generally taken the statement in Mark 6:3 referring to Jesus as "Is not this the carpenter...?" as an indication that before the age of 30 Jesus had been working as a carpenter. The tone of the passage leading to the question "Is not this the carpenter?" suggests familiarity with Jesus in the area, reinforcing that he had been generally seen as a carpenter in the gospel account before the start of his ministry. Matthew 13:55 poses the question as "Is not this the carpenter's son?" suggesting that the profession tektōn had been a family business and Jesus was engaged in it before starting his preaching and ministry in the gospel accounts.

Background of Galilee and Judea

The historical record of the large number of workmen employed in the rebuilding of Sepphoris has led Batey (1984) and others to suggest that when Jesus was in his teens and twenties carpenters would have found more employment at Sepphoris rather than at the small town of Nazareth.

Aside from secular employment some attempts have been made to reconstruct the theological and rabbinical circumstances of the "unknown years", e.g., soon after the discovery of the Dead Sea Scrolls novelist Edmund Wilson (1955) suggested Jesus may have studied with the Essenes, followed by the Unitarian Charles F. Potter (1958) and others. Other writers have taken the view that the predominance of Pharisees in Judea during that period, and Jesus' own later recorded interaction with the Pharisees, makes a Pharisee background more likely, as in the recorded case of another Galilean, Josephus studied with all three groups: Pharisees, Sadducees and Essenes.

Other sources

The New Testament apocrypha and early Christian pseudepigrapha preserve various pious legends filling the "gaps" in Christ's youth. Charlesworth (2008) explains this as due to the canonical Gospels having left "a narrative vacuum" that many have attempted to fill.

Jesus' childhood is described in the Infancy Gospel of Thomas, the Gospel of Pseudo-Matthew, and the Syriac Infancy Gospel, among other sources.

Claims of young Jesus in Britain
During the late 12th century, Joseph of Arimathea became connected with the Arthurian cycle, appearing in them as the first keeper of the Holy Grail. This idea first appears in Robert de Boron's Joseph d'Arimathie, in which Joseph receives the Grail from an apparition of Jesus and sends it with his followers to Britain. This theme is elaborated upon in Boron's sequels and in subsequent Arthurian works penned by others.

Some Arthurian legends hold that Jesus travelled to Britain as a boy, lived at Priddy in the Mendips, and built the first wattle cabin at Glastonbury. William Blake's early 19th-century poem "And did those feet in ancient time" was inspired by the story of Jesus travelling to Britain. In some versions, Joseph was supposedly a tin merchant and took Jesus under his care when his mother Mary was widowed. Gordon Strachan wrote Jesus the Master Builder: Druid Mysteries and the Dawn of Christianity (1998), which was the basis of the documentary titled And Did Those Feet (2009). Strachan believed Jesus may have travelled to Britain to study with the Druids.

Claims of young Jesus in India and/or Tibet

Nicolas Notovich, 1887

In 1887, Russian war correspondent Nicolas Notovitch claimed that while at the Hemis Monastery in Ladakh, he had learned of a document called the "Life of Saint Issa, Best of the Sons of Men" – Isa being the Arabic name of Jesus in Islam. Notovitch's story, with a translated text of the "Life of Saint Issa", was published in French in 1894 as La vie inconnue de Jesus Christ (Unknown Life of Jesus Christ).

According to the scrolls, Jesus abandoned Jerusalem at the age of 13 and set out towards Sindh, “intending to improve and perfect himself in the divine understanding and to studying the laws of the great Buddha”. He crossed Punjab and reached Puri Jagannath where he studied the Vedas under Brahmin priests. He spent six years in Puri and Rajgirh, near Nalanda, the ancient seat of Hindu learning. Then he went to the Himalayas, and spent time in Tibetan monasteries, studying Buddhism, and through Persia, returned to Jerusalem at the age of 29.

Notovitch's writings were immediately controversial and Max Müller stated that either the monks at the monastery had deceived Notovitch (or played a joke on him), or he had fabricated the evidence. Müller then wrote to the monastery at Hemis and the head lama replied that there had been no Western visitor at the monastery in the past fifteen years and there were no documents related to Notovitch's story. J. Archibald Douglas then visited Hemis monastery and interviewed the head lama who stated that Notovitch had never been there. Indologist Leopold von Schroeder called Notovitch's story a "big fat lie". Wilhelm Schneemelcher states that Notovich's accounts were soon exposed as fabrications, and that to date no one has even had a glimpse at the manuscripts Notovitch claims to have had.

Notovich responded to claims to defend himself. But once his story had been re-examined by historians – some even questioning his existence – it is claimed that Notovitch confessed to having fabricated the evidence. Bart D. Ehrman states that "Today there is not a single recognized scholar on the planet who has any doubts about the matter. The entire story was invented by Notovitch, who earned a good deal of money and a substantial amount of notoriety for his hoax". However, others deny that Notovich ever accepted the accusations against him – that his account was a forgery, etc. Although he was not impressed with his story, Sir Francis Younghusband recalls meeting Nicolas Notovitch near Skardu, not long before Notovitch had visited Hemis monastery.

In 1922, Swami Abhedananda, the president of the Vedanta Society of New York between 1897 and 1921 and the author of several books, went to the Himalayas on foot and reached Tibet, where he studied Buddhist philosophy and Tibetan Buddhism. He went to the Hemis Monastery, and allegedly found the manuscript translated by Notovitch, which was a Tibetan translation of the original scrolls written in Pali. The lama said that it was a copy and that the original was in a monastery at Marbour near Lhasa. After Abhedananda's death in 1939, one of his disciples inquired about the documents at the Hemis monastery, but was told that they had disappeared.

Levi H. Dowling, 1908

In 1908, Levi H. Dowling published the Aquarian Gospel of Jesus the Christ which he claimed was channeled to him from the "Akashic Records" as the true story of the life of Jesus, including "the 'lost' eighteen years silent in the New Testament." The narrative follows the young Jesus across India, Tibet, Persia, Assyria, Greece and Egypt. Dowling's work was later used by Holger Kersten who combined it with elements derived from other sources such as the Ahmadiyya beliefs.

Nicholas Roerich, 1925

In 1925, Nicholas Roerich recorded his travels through Ladakh in India.  This portion of his journal was published in 1933 as part of Altai Himalaya.  He recounts legends of Issa shared with him by the Ladakhi people and lamas, including that Issa (Jesus) traveled from Palestine to India with merchants and taught the people.  An extended section of this text parallels sections of Notovitch's book, and Roerich comments on the remarkable similarity of the accounts of the Ladakhis to these passages, despite the Ladakhis having no knowledge of Notovitch's book. He also recounts that the stories of others on his travel refer to various manuscripts and legends regarding Jesus (Issa) and that he personally visited the "abbot" of Hemis.

Rejection by modern mainstream New Testament scholarship
Modern mainstream Christian scholarship has generally rejected any travels by Jesus to India, Tibet or surrounding areas as without historical basis:

Robert Van Voorst states that modern scholarship has "almost unanimously agreed" that claims of the travels of Jesus to Tibet, Kashmir or rest of India contain "nothing of value".

Marcus Borg states that the suggestions that an adult Jesus traveled to Egypt or India and came into contact with Buddhism are "without historical foundation".
John Dominic Crossan states that none of the theories presented about the travels of Jesus to fill the gap between his early life and the start of his ministry have been supported by modern scholarship.
Leslie Houlden states that although modern parallels between the teachings of Jesus and Buddha have been drawn, these comparisons emerged after missionary contacts in the 19th century and there is no historically reliable evidence of contacts between Buddhism and Jesus.
Paula Fredriksen states that no serious scholarly work places Jesus outside the backdrop of 1st century Palestinian Judaism.

Other claims

Japan

Some people in Japan have believed that Jesus visited them during the lost years and possibly survived the crucifixion to remain in Japan for the rest of his life. The legend exists in a village named Shingō, Aomori.

Artistic and literary renditions
In 1996, the documentary Mysteries of the Bible presented an overview of the theories related to the travels of Jesus to India and interviewed a number of scholars on the subject.
Edward T. Martin's book King of Travelers: Jesus' Lost Years in India (2008) was used as the basis for Paul Davids' film Jesus in India (2008) shown on the Sundance Channel. The book and film cover Martin's search for Notovitch's claimed "Life of Issa."

The book Lamb: The Gospel According to Biff, Christ's Childhood Pal, by Christopher Moore, is a fictional comedy which tells the story of Jesus's adolescence and his travels to India and China from the point of view of Jesus's best friend Biff.

See also

 Basilideans
 Gospel of Barnabas
 Gospel of Basilides
 Gospel of James
 Life of Jesus in the New Testament

References

Further reading
Fida Hassnain. Search For The Historical Jesus. Down-to-Earth Books, 2006. 
 Tricia McCannon. Jesus: The Explosive Story of the 30 Lost Years and the Ancient Mystery Religions. Charlottesville, VA: Hampton Roads Publishing Company, Inc., 2010. .
 Charles Potter. Lost Years of Jesus Revealed., Fawcett, 1985. 
 Elizabeth Clare Prophet. The Lost Years of Jesus' Life: Documentary Evidence of Jesus's 17-Year Journey to the East. Gardiner, Mont.: Summit University Press, 1987. .
 Paramahansa Yogananda. "The Unknown Years of Jesus—Sojourn in India." Discourse 5 in The Second Coming of Christ: The Resurrection of the Christ Within You: A Revelatory Commentary on the Original Teachings of Jesus. 2 vol. Los Angeles, CA: Self-Realization Fellowship, 2004. 

Jesus
Denial of the crucifixion of Jesus